Mirco Gualdi (born 7 July 1968) is an Italian former professional racing cyclist. He rode in five editions of the Giro d'Italia. He also competed in the men's road race at the 1992 Summer Olympics.

Major results

1985
 2nd Time trial, National Junior Road Championships
1989
5th Gran Premio della Liberazione
1990
1st Trofeo Alcide Degasperi
1st GP Industria e Commercio – Tr. Città di San Vendemiano
1991
1st Gran Premio Industria e Commercio Artigianato Carnaghese
1992
1st GP Industria e Commercio – Tr. Città di San Vendemiano
1993
1st Stage 4 Tour de Pologne
1997
1st Stage 17 Giro d'Italia
1st Stage 7 Ruta de Mexico
10th Veenendaal–Veenendaal
1998
2nd Paris–Tours
 3rd Time trial, National Road Championships

References

External links
 

1968 births
Living people
Italian male cyclists
Cyclists from the Province of Bergamo
Cyclists at the 1992 Summer Olympics
Olympic cyclists of Italy